Alan Parker (1944–2020) was an English film director, producer, writer, and actor.

Alan Parker may also refer to:

 Alan Parker (musician) (born 1944), British guitarist for the band Blue Mink
 Alan G. Parker (born 1965), British music biographer (films and books)
 Alan Parker, alter-ego of British comedian Simon Munnery
 Alan Parker (radio show), a 1995 radio show featuring the character
 Alan Parker, Road Warrior, a 1996 radio show featuring the character
 Alan Parker (athlete) (1928–2012), British long-distance runner
 Alan Parker (businessman) (born 1939), British businessman, DFS Galleria
 Alan C. Parker (born 1946), British businessman, chairman of Mothercare, former CEO of Whitbread
 Alan Parker, a character in the Judge Parker comic strip

See also
C. Allen Parker (born 1955), American business executive and attorney
Al Parker (disambiguation)

Parker, Alan